Walter Richmond Butler (24 March 1864 – 31 May 1949), was an Australian architect trained in the Arts and Crafts style, born in Somerset, England.

Personal life

In 1864 Walter Richmond Butler was born on his family’s farm in Pensford in Somerset, England. He was the sixth of eight children. At 15 Butler became the apprentice of developing Arts and Crafts architect Alexander Lauder (1836–1921), who allegedly described Butler as "a truly gifted person".

Butler frequently travelled throughout England and Europe and it was not until 1888 that Butler decided to follow in the footsteps of five of his siblings and emigrate to Australia in search of prosperity and exciting new possibilities. He departed from Plymouth on the SS Oroya on 21 July arriving in Sydney in October, and by the end of the year had moved to Melbourne.

Butler married Emelie Millicent Howard in April 1894, and they had three children: Adna Millicent Howard, Howard Richmond Henry and Winifred Howard. The family lived in Armadale in the eastern suburbs of Melbournein a large house called Duncraig. Butler’s daughter Adna once described him as "a very energetic man… never idle. He was good at all ball games… and was as fond of dancing and playing bridge as he was of mending anything".

At the age of 21, Butler’s son Howard died fighting in WWI, and it was after this that Butler appeared to limit his professional involvement in architecture. He did however continue as a practicing architect until he retired in 1939 at the age of 75. He died in 1949 at the age of 84.

Professional life

Having trained with Alexander Lauder in Barnstaple UK, Butler worked for three years in the office of J D Sedding in London where he was accepted into the domestic revival groups centered on William Lethaby, Ernest Gimson and a number of other architects around Richard Norman Shaw and William Morris. In 1885 W. R. Lethaby encouraged Butler to move to London and work with J. D. Sedding, there, he worked for 3 years. In June 1888 Butler left Sedding's firm and set for Australia, where he resided and worked in Melbourne. Three of Butler's brothers and one of his sisters also settled in Australia. From 1889 until 1893 Butler worked in collaboration with Beverely Ussher. In 1896 George C. Inskip joined his practice, however their association ended in 1905 after a disagreement with the Royal Victorian Institute of Architects over the conduct of a competition. In 1907-16 he partnered Ernest R. Bradshaw and after World War I he was in association with his nephew Richard (b. 1892) as W. & R. Butler, which shortly included Marcus Martin. In the late 1930s Butler was in partnership with Hugh Pettit before retiring when Pettit enlisted for World War II.

Notable projects

The Missions to Seamen (1916)

In 1916 Walter Butler designed the Anglican mission building located
on 717 Flinders Street Docklands. It was designed in a mixture of styles one
being in the style of Spanish mission revival, which was prevalent during the
1890s, and his immense experience in the arts and craft architecture. What
made The Missions to Seamen building so significant was the introduction of the
Spanish Mission style to Melbourne. The revival of this building is evident in its
bell tower with its pinnacles, its rough-hewn timber trusses, and the monastic-
like courtyard. This style soon after became popular in the Melbourne suburbs.

David Syme Tomb (1908)

Walter Butler was selected to carry out the commissioning of this tomb situated
in Boroondara Cemetery in Kew. The tomb was designed similarly to an Egyptian temple, only smaller and encompassing a similar symbolic context. Butler
ensured that the symbolism best represented Symes character merged
with his growing interest in iconography architecture.

Edzell Mansion (1892)

Located in Toorak along the Southbank of the Yarra River, the Edzell mansion
can be said to be one of Tooraks grandest mansions. It was originally designed
by the architects Reed Smart and Tappin and in 1917 Butler designed extensions
to the mansion including a ballroom and an additional garden to the property.
What makes this mansion so significant is the mixture of architectural styles by
prominent architects.

Other projects

Houses/mansions

Blackwood (1891) near Penshurst for R.B. Richie
Wangarella (1894) in NSW for Thomas Milear
Newminster Park (1901) near Camperdown for A.S. Chirnside
Warrawee (1906) in Toorak for A. Rutter Clark
Thanes (1907) in Kooyong for F.Wallach
Kamillaroi (1907) for Clive Baillieu

Churches

Bishopscourt (Extensions) (1902) in East Melbourne
St Albans (1899) in Armadale
Wangaratta Cathedral (1907)
Christ Church (c.1910) in Benalla

City buildings

Collins House (1910)
Queensland Insurance Building(1911)

References

External links
Heritage Listing for the Missions to Seamen

1860 births
1949 deaths
Arts and Crafts architects
Victorian (Australia) architects
Federation architects